Brandenburg-Briest Solarpark is photovoltaic power station, located at a former military airfield in Brandenburg, Germany. At the time of its completion, it was the largest solar park in Europe. Equipped with Q-Cells solar modules, it consists of three sections, namely
Brandenburg-Briest East (30 MW) 
Brandenburg-Briest West (30 MW)
and Briest-Havelsee (31 MW) 
that add up to a total installed capacity of 91 megawatts (MW), sufficient to supply the electricity needs of more than 11,500 households.

See also 

Photovoltaic power stations
List of largest power stations in the world
List of photovoltaic power stations

References 

Photovoltaic power stations in Germany
Economy of Brandenburg
2011 establishments in Germany